"Autoestima" (Spanish for "Self Esteem") is a song recorded by Spanish group Cupido for their debut studio album Préstame Un Sentimiento (2019). It was remixed and released as a single on 9 August 2019 through Universal Music Spain and Primavera Sound this time featuring vocals of Spanish singer Lola Indigo and production by Barcelonian musician Alizzz.

Background 
Spanish music group Cupido started in 2017 as a collaboration between drummer Solo Astra and singer Pimp Flaco and evolved into a 5-member supergroup defined by its "unique sound in the Spanish musical panorama, that mixes trap and independent music turning it into a very new pop". The formation released its first single "No Sabes Mentir" in 2017 and, since that moment, started shaping their debut studio album "Préstame Un Sentimiento", released on 14 February 2019. "Autoestima", included in the album, became an instant fan favorite. In order to make it a single and make their name even bigger, the group collaborated with ex-Operación Triunfo contestant Lola Indigo and with Catalan producer Alizzz who has made songs for and with C. Tangana, Becky G and Rosalía between others.

Commercial performance 
The remix of "Autoestima" debuted on the PROMUSICAE chart at number 74 and peaked at number 61 after two weeks. The song charted for five consecutive weeks. It was the most-played song during the 2019 MTV Video Music Awards retransmission breaks in Spain, the most-viewed VMA's in Spain in MTV history in large part due to the performance of Spanish singer turned international pop phenomenon Rosalía.

Charts

Release history

References 

2019 singles
2019 songs
Lola Índigo songs